Avanzini is a surname. Notable people with the surname include:

Anna Avanzini (1917–2011), Italian gymnast
Bartolomeo Avanzini (1608–1658), Italian architect
Giuseppe Avanzini (1753–1827), Italian mathematician and prelate
John Avanzini (born 1936), American televangelist and Bible teacher
Michel Avanzini (born 1989), Swiss footballer 
Pietro Antonio Avanzini (1656–1733), Italian painter
Sebastian Avanzini (born 1995), Italian footballer 
Vittoria Avanzini (born 1915, date of death unknown), Italian gymnast